was the fortieth of the sixty-nine stations of the Nakasendō, as well as the eighth of eleven stations on the Kisoji. It is located in the present-day village of Ōkuwa, in the Kiso District of Nagano Prefecture, Japan.

History
Nojiri-juku was the longest post town along the Kisoji, after Narai-juku. Because of all the turns in the road, though, it was often called "Nana-mawari (七回り)," which means "seven turns." However, there was a large fire in 1791, which destroyed much of the post town.

Neighboring post towns
Nakasendō & Kisoji
Suhara-juku – Nojiri-juku – Midono-juku

References

Stations of the Nakasendō
Stations of the Nakasendo in Nagano Prefecture